James White (2 January 1938 – 2 September 2014) was an Irish businessman and hotelier, and a Fine Gael Teachta Dála (TD) for constituencies in County Donegal.

He was elected to Dáil Éireann as Fine Gael TD for the Donegal–Leitrim constituency at the 1973 general election. He was re-elected at the 1977 general election as the TD for the new Donegal constituency.  After further boundary changes, he was re-elected at the 1981 general election as the TD for Donegal South-West, and did not contest the February 1982 general election. He stood again for Donegal South-West at the 1992 and 2002 general elections but was not elected on either occasion.

His Ballyshannon-based company, the White's Hotel Group, owns several large hotels in the spa town of Lisdoonvarna, County Clare, renowned for its annual matchmaking festival.

He died on 2 September 2014.

References

1938 births
2014 deaths
Fine Gael TDs
Members of the 20th Dáil
Members of the 21st Dáil
Members of the 22nd Dáil
Irish hoteliers